York Council may be:
 City of York Council
 York Council (Pennsylvania)